Chetwood is an English surname. Notable people with the surname include:

Benjamin Chetwood (1655–1728), English-born Irish politician 
Clifford Chetwood (born 1928), British businessman
Knightly Chetwood (1650–1720), English priest, poet and translator 
William Chetwood (1771–1857), American politician
William Rufus Chetwood (died 1766), English publisher

See also
Chetwood Creek, a river in California, United States
Chetwoot Lake, in the heart of the Alpine Lakes Wilderness, Washington, United States
Chetwode
Chetwode (surname)
Baron Chetwode